Clinton Solomon (born October 21, 1983) is an American football wide receiver for the Texas Revolution of Champions Indoor Football (CIF). He played college football at the University of Iowa.

College career
Solomon signed to play football for the Iowa Hawkeyes on February 1, 2002. After playing as a freshman, Solomon left Iowa due to his poor grades, and attended Iowa Central Community College during the 2003 school year, where he played for the Tritons. After the school year, Solomon returned to the Hawkeyes. Solomon returned to Iowa with a terrific junior season, earning 2nd Team All-Big Ten Conference honors.

Professional career

NFL
After going undrafted in the 2006 NFL Draft, Solomon signed as an undrafted free agent with the St. Louis Rams. He was released on September 1, 2006. Solomon signed with the Tennessee Titans during the 2007 offseason, but was waived on July 25, 2007. Solomon signed with the Chicago Bears later in September, 2007.

Wichita Wild
After spending the entire 2008 season on the practice squad of the Chicago Rush, Solomon signed with the Wichita Wild of the Indoor Football League (IFL). Solomon was named 1st Team All-IFL, finishing fourth in both receiving yards (1,008) and receiving touchdowns (22) on the year. Solomon would once again be a 1st Team All-IFL selection in 2010, and a 2nd Team selection in 2011.

Sioux Falls Storm
Solomon moved on to the Sioux Falls Storm in 2012, helping the Storm win their second IFL Championship. Solomon returned to the Storm in 2013, helping them win their 3rd consecutive title.

Texas Revolution
Solomon joined the Texas Revolution for the 2014 season.

San Antonio Talons
Solomon joined the San Antonio Talons of the Arena Football League (AFL), to finish the 2014 season.

Las Vegas Outlaws
Solomon was assigned to the Las Vegas Outlaws in 2015. He was placed on reassigned on July 28, 2015. On July 30, 2015, he was assigned back with the Outlaws.

Return to Texas
In February, 2016, Solomon returned to the Texas Revolution. On February 8, 2017, Solomon re-signed with the Revolution.

References

External links
Iowa bio
Arena Football bio

Living people
1983 births
American football wide receivers
Iowa Hawkeyes football players
Iowa Central Tritons football players
Chicago Rush players
Wichita Wild players
Sioux Falls Storm players
Kansas City Renegades players
Texas Revolution players
San Antonio Talons players
Las Vegas Outlaws (arena football) players